Sarah Àlainn  is a vocalist, violinist, composer, lyricist, translator, and copywriter from Australia, mostly active in Japan.
Known to have a musical range that exceeds three octaves, displays perfect pitch and has synesthesia.

In 2010, her vocals were featured on the closing theme song "Beyond the Sky" (composed by Yasunori Mitsuda) for the Xenoblade video game on Nintendo Wii. While studying at the University of Tokyo, she learned that composer Yasunori Mitsuda was looking for a singer with native-language English for a video game song, and she was hired by Mitsuda for the role. After returning to Australia, she learned that the song was very well received, and decided to become a singer.  Àlainn returned to Japan with her family's permission (for only a year) only to begin her musical career. Near the end of the one-year period before she had to return to Australia, her demo CD went to Universal Music and they extended her a recording contract. Her father had recently died and she thinks the contract was his gift to her from beyond the grave.

Her second classical music album "Sarah" had originally charted at no. 13 in the Billboard Japan Top Classical Albums. In December 2014 it moved up to no. 1, after Japanese figure skater Yuzuru Hanyu had performed to the song "The final time traveler" at the exhibition gala of the 2014–15 Grand Prix Final. Àlainn also presented the song with Hanyu as a live music collaboration at the 2014 edition of the touring ice show Fantasy on Ice.

Since 2018, she has been the co-host of Kabuki Kool (alongside Kataoka Ainosuke VI), an NHK program used to introduce kabuki to foreign audiences.

Albums

References

Japanese musicians
Fantasy on Ice guest artists
1986 births
Living people
20th-century Japanese women singers
20th-century Japanese singers
21st-century Japanese women singers
21st-century Japanese singers